Jair Henrique Alves Junior (born 1 October 1978) is a Brazilian handball player. He competed in the men's tournament at the 2004 Summer Olympics.

References

External links
 

1978 births
Living people
Brazilian male handball players
Olympic handball players of Brazil
Handball players at the 2004 Summer Olympics
People from Maringá
Handball players at the 2003 Pan American Games
Pan American Games medalists in handball
Pan American Games gold medalists for Brazil
Medalists at the 2003 Pan American Games
Sportspeople from Paraná (state)
21st-century Brazilian people